Haikou Xiuying Port, is a seaport located 7 km west of Haikou New Port, in Haikou, Hainan, China.

Xiuying Port will relocate to an area several hundred metres north of South Port, the southern terminus of the Guangdong–Hainan Railway.

Gallery

References

External links

Ports and harbours of Hainan
Buildings and structures in Haikou
Ferry terminals in China